July 2016

References

 07
July 2016 events in the United States